Afie Jurvanen (born April 28, 1981), known by his stage name Bahamas, is a Canadian musician.

Early life 
Jurvanen was born in Toronto and raised in Barrie, Ontario. He is of Finnish ancestry.

Career
Jurvanen taught himself guitar. He worked with a variety of musicians that includes The Lumineers, City and Colour, Feist, Howie Beck, Jason Collett, Jack Johnson, The Weather Station, and Zeus. Downtown Music Publishing represents Bahamas' songs. Jurvanen recorded his debut album, Pink Strat, in a cabin in rural Ontario in 2008. He released the album under the name Bahamas in 2009 and was subsequently nominated for a 2010 Juno Award for Roots & Traditional Album of the Year – Solo.

Bahamas' second album, Barchords, was released on February 7, 2012. The album received nomination at the 2013 Juno Awards for the Adult Alternative Album of the Year. Jurvanen received a nomination for Songwriter of the Year for the tracks "Be My Witness", "Caught Me Thinking", and "Lost in the Light".

Jurvanen released his third album, Bahamas Is Afie on August 19, 2014. The album received first place on Q'''s Top 20 Albums of 2014. Bahamas Is Afie received a nomination for Adult Alternative Album of the Year At the Juno Awards of 2015, and Jurvanen received nomination for Songwriter of the Year for "All the Time", "Bitter Memories" and "Stronger Than That". He won the awards in both categories.

Jurvanen tours with drummer Jason Tait and backing vocalist Felicity Williams. Bahamas opened for Jack Johnson, Robert Plant, Wilco, The Lumineers and City and Colour.

Jurvanen released his fourth album, Earthtones on January 19, 2018. Bahamas began their Canadian tour for Earthtones on January 18, 2018, the Earthtones World Tour and recruited Zach Gill to open the shows.

Jurvanen released his fifth studio album, Sad Hunk'', on October 9, 2020. The album won the Juno Award for Adult Alternative Album of the Year at the Juno Awards of 2021.

Discography

Albums

Singles

Personal life
Jurvanen lived in The Junction neighborhood of Toronto with his wife and two children until December 2018, when they relocated to Nova Scotia.

References

External links
 

1981 births
Living people
Canadian male guitarists
Canadian male singer-songwriters
Canadian folk singer-songwriters
Canadian indie rock musicians
Musicians from Barrie
Musicians from Toronto
Canadian people of Finnish descent
Juno Award for Adult Alternative Album of the Year winners
Juno Award for Songwriter of the Year winners
21st-century Canadian guitarists
21st-century Canadian male singers